Fyodor Alexeyevich Koni (Фёдор Алексеевич Кони, 21 March 1809, Moscow, Russian Empire, - 6 February 1879, Saint Petersburg, Russian Empire) was a Russian dramatist, theatre critic and literary historian, editor and memoirist. Lawyer, author and politician Anatoly Koni (1844-1927) was Fyodor Koni's son.

Biography
A Moscow University'a alumni, Koni first came to attention in the 1830s as an author of vaudevilles (The Hussar Girl, Flats of Petersburg, Husband in a Fireplace, among them). In 1840 Koni founded and became the editor of the Pantheon magazine (which later merged with another publication and changed its name to Repertoire and Pantheon). His epic monograph "The Life of Friedrich the Great" came out in 1863 and earned him a Doctor of Philosophy degree at the University of Jena. The Works of F. A. Koni (compiled of plays only), came out in 1871. Fyodor Koni died in 1879 in Saint Petersburg and was buried at the Nikolskoe Cemetery of the Alexander Nevsky Lavra.

References 

Russian dramatists and playwrights
Russian editors
1809 births
1879 deaths
Burials at Nikolskoe Cemetery